The Charles M. and Emma M. Fischer Fleshman House is a historical residence located in Hawarden, Iowa, United States.  Charles M. Fleshman was a leading businessman in the town from when he arrived in the mid-1880s and until his death in 1926.  He had this 1½-story house built in 1889 and it was altered c. 1897–1905.  It is a typical Victorian style house with influences from the Greek Revival, Italianate, Queen Anne and Vernacular styles.  Alterations included the front porch. The  frame structure features an irregular plan, cross gabled roof, and balloon frame.  It was listed on the National Register of Historic Places in 1993.

References

Houses on the National Register of Historic Places in Iowa
Victorian architecture in Iowa
Houses completed in 1889
Houses in Sioux County, Iowa
National Register of Historic Places in Sioux County, Iowa
1889 establishments in Iowa